The birch bark letter given the document number 292 is the oldest known document in any Finnic language. The document is dated to the beginning of the 13th century. It was found in 1957 by a Soviet expedition led by Artemiy Artsikhovsky in the Nerevsky excavation on the left coast side of Novgorod. It is currently held at the Novgorod City Museum. 

The language used in the document is thought to be an archaic form of Livvi-Karelian, the language spoken in Olonets Karelia, although the exact form is difficult to determine, as Finnic dialects were still developing during that period.

Transcription

The text is written in Cyrillic in the Karelian dialect of the archaic Finnic language. A transcription of the text is as follows:

Interpretations

By Yuri Yeliseyev
The text, as transliterated to the Latin alphabet by Yuri Yeliseyev in 1959 and interpreted in modern Finnish:

In English, this means roughly the following:

Yeliseyev believes, that this is an invocation against lightning, as evidenced by "ten your names" construction. According to superstitious notions, knowledge of the name gives a human the magic power over an object or phenomenon.

By Martti Haavio
As the orthography used does not utilize spaces between words, the source text can be transcribed into words in different ways. Martti Haavio gives a different interpretation of the text in his 1964 article, suggesting, that this is a sort of an oath:

In modern Finnish, this means roughly the following:

In modern Estonian, this means roughly the following:

In English, this means roughly the following:

By Yevgeny Khelimsky
Professor Yevgeny Khelimsky in his 1986 work criticizes Haavio's interpretation and gives the third known scientific interpretation, believing the letter to be an invocation, like Yeliseyev:

A translation into Finnish of this interpretation would look something like this:

In English, it means roughly the following:

†Syyttö-Jumala could also mean "Blaming God" or "God that blames"; modern Finnish syyttää = to blame or prosecute.

See also 
 Käymäjärvi Inscriptions

References

Sources
 Jelisejev, J. S. Vanhin itämerensuomalainen kielenmuistomerkki, Virittäjä-lehti 1961: 134
 Jelisejev, J. S. Itämerensuomalaisia kielenmuistomerkkejä (Zusammenfassung: Ostseefinnische Sprachdenkmäler), Virittäjä-lehti 1966: 296 
 Martti Haavio The Letter on Birch-Bark No. 292, Journal of the Folklore Institute, 1964. 
 Haavio, Martti, Tuohikirje n:o 292. Vanha suomalaisen muinaisuskonnon lähde, Virittäjä-lehti 1964: 1

External links
  Birch bark letter no. 292 (includes a photo and references) - at the website on Russian birch bark letters
  Tuohikirje 292
   Vielä kerran itämerensuomen vanhimmista muistomerkeistä - with (English) summary following references

Finnic languages
Novgorod Republic
Earliest known manuscripts by language
Uralic inscriptions
History of Novgorod Oblast
Incantation
13th-century inscriptions
13th century in Russia
Betula
1957 in Russia
1957 archaeological discoveries